The Smoky River is a river in western Alberta, Canada. It is a major tributary of the Peace River.  The descriptive name refers to the presence of "smouldering beds of coal in the riverbank" noted by the Cree Indians.

Course

The Smoky River originates in the Canadian Rockies, in the northern area of Jasper National Park from Adolphus Lake (53.171N 119.117W). It then flows north east through the Willmore Wilderness Park until it passes near the town of Grande Cache. It continues north, passes Watino and merges into the Peace River south of the Town of Peace River, Alberta.

Tributaries

Adolphus Lake
Calumet Creek
Carcajou Creek
Swoda Creek
Chown Creek
Twintree Lake
Short Creek
Rockville Creek
Azure Lake
Desolation Creek
No Luck Creek
Jackpine River
Muddywater River
Wolverine Creek
Calypso Creek
Corral Creek
Gentain Creek
Goldrenrod Creek
Lawrence Creek
Henrietta Creek
Delome Creek
Davey Creek
Eaton Creek
Sulphur River
Two Cabin Creek
Roddy Creek
Muskeg River
Sheep Creek
Norris Creek
Bolton Creek
Kakwa River
Cutbank River
Micmillar Creek
Lignite Creek
Ellenwood Lake
Wapiti River
Simonette River
Kleskun Creek
Puskwaskau River
Bad Heart River
Little Smoky River
Peavine Creek
Hunting Creek
Lalby Creek

See also
List of rivers of Alberta

References

Rivers of Alberta
Rivers of the Canadian Rockies